The year 2009 is the 17th year in the history of Pancrase, a mixed martial arts promotion based in Japan. In 2009 Pancrase held 10 events beginning with Pancrase: Changing Tour 1.

Title fights

Events list

Pancrase: Changing Tour 1

Pancrase: Changing Tour 1 was an event held on February 1, 2009 at The Differ Ariake Arena in Tokyo, Japan.

Results

Pancrase: Changing Tour 2

Pancrase: Changing Tour 2 was an event held on April 5, 2009 at The Differ Ariake Arena in Tokyo, Japan.

Results

Pancrase: Pancrase Gate 2009

Pancrase: Pancrase Gate 2009 was an event held on May 24, 2009 at The Gold's Gym South Tokyo Annex in Tokyo, Japan.

Results

Pancrase: Changing Tour 3

Pancrase: Changing Tour 3 was an event held on June 7, 2009 at The Differ Ariake Arena in Tokyo, Japan.

Results

Pancrase: Pancrase Gate 2009

Pancrase: Pancrase Gate 2009 was an event held on July 26, 2009 at The Gold's Gym South Tokyo Annex in Tokyo, Japan.

Results

Pancrase: Changing Tour 4

Pancrase: Changing Tour 4 was an event held on August 8, 2009 at The Differ Ariake Arena in Tokyo, Japan.

Results

Pancrase: Changing Tour 5

Pancrase: Changing Tour 5 was an event held on October 17, 2009 at Shinjuku Face in Tokyo, Japan.

Results

Pancrase: Changing Tour 6

Pancrase: Changing Tour 6 was an event held on October 25, 2009 at Differ Ariake Arena in Tokyo, Japan.

Results

Pancrase: Changing Tour 7

Pancrase: Changing Tour 7 was an event held on November 8, 2009 at Azelea Taisho Hall in Osaka, Osaka, Japan.

Results

Pancrase: Changing Tour 8

Pancrase: Changing Tour 8 was an event held on December 6, 2009 at Differ Ariake Arena in Tokyo, Japan.

Results

See also 
 Pancrase
 List of Pancrase champions
 List of Pancrase events

References

Pancrase events
2009 in mixed martial arts